Wiki Loves Earth (WLE) is an annual international photographic competition held throughout May and June, organised worldwide by the Wikipedia community members with the help of local Wikimedia affiliates across the globe. Participants take pictures of local natural heritage and scenic landscape in their countries, and upload them to Wikimedia Commons.

The aim of the event is to highlight the conservation areas of the participating countries with the goal to encourage people to capture pictures of these sights, and to put them under a free license which can then be re-used not only on Wikipedia but everywhere by everyone.

The first Wiki Loves Earth competition was held in 2013 in Ukraine, and the contest became international in 2014. In 2019, 37 countries participated in the contest.

In 2020, the international contest has been extended into July as a response to the global COVID-19 pandemic. As of late June, 35 countries have declared their participation in the 2021 contest edition, with more than 63,000 photos uploaded to date.

History 
The first Wiki Loves Earth competition was held in 2013 in Ukraine. Head of its organizing committee was ethnographer Yevhen Buket. In the next years the competition become international and spread to other countries. In 2014, the competition was extended beyond Europe, with a total of 16 participating countries. The 2015 edition of Wiki Loves Earth has seen more than 8,500 contestants participating from 26 countries, with over 100,000 photo submissions. A photo from Pakistan won grand prize in 2015 edition of Wiki Loves Earth, depicting Shangrila Resort, located at Skardu, Gilgit-Baltistan, Pakistan.

Wiki Loves Earth 2016 saw more than 7,000 participants from 26 countries, with over 75,000 photographs submitted. In 2017, the contest expanded its geography more than ever before, with 36 countries participating that year and the contest reaching a record number of over 131,000 uploaded photographs. The number of participating countries slightly decreased in 2018, but the year of 2019 has again seen 37 countries taking part in the competition. Over the past several years, Wiki Loves Earth cooperated with UNESCO, holding special nominations for UNESCO biosphere reserves and UNESCO Global Geoparks.

Wiki Loves Earth is a sister competition of Wiki Loves Monuments, which is also an annual international photographic competition held during the month of September, organised worldwide by the Wikipedia community members and focus on local historical monuments and heritage sites. WLM according to the Guinness Book of Records, is the world's largest photography competition.

Winners 
The following is a list of international first prize winners of Wiki Loves Earth:

Statistics

References

External links 

 
 Statistics of Wiki Loves Earth (general and per each participating country)

 
Wiki communities
Recurring events established in 2013